The Queensland Oaks is a Brisbane Racing Club  Group 1 Thoroughbred horse race for three-year-old fillies, at set weights, run over a distance of 2400 metres at Eagle Farm Racecourse, Brisbane during the Queensland Winter Racing Carnival. Total prize money is A$700,000.

History

The inaugural running of the race was run as the Queensland Oaks Stakes during the Christmas meeting at Eagle Farm on December 27, 1951 when short odds-on favourite Malt Maid was victorious. By 1953 the race was run on the Queensland Cup race card in November. The race was moved as part of the Brisbane Winter Carnival in 1973.

Grade
1951–1979 - Principal race
1980 onwards - Group 1 race

Distance
1951–1972 -  miles 
1973–1982 – 2400 metres
1983 – 2432 metres
1984–2014 – 2400 metres
2015 – 2200 metres
2016 – 2400 metres
2017–2019 – 2200 metres
2021–2022 - 2200 metres

Venue

Due to track reconstruction of Eagle Farm Racecourse for the 2014–15 racing season, the event was transferred to Doomben Racecourse with a shorter distance of 2200 metres.

 2015 - Doomben Racecourse
 2017 - Doomben Racecourse
 2018 - Doomben Racecourse
 2019 - Doomben Racecourse

Winners

 2022 - Gypsy Goddess
 2021 - Duais
 2020 - ‡race not held
 2019 - Winning Ways
 2018 - Youngstar
 2017 - Egg Tart
 2016 - Provocative
 2015 - Winx
 2014 - Tinto
 2013 - Gondokoro
 2012 - Quintessential
 2011 - Scarlett Lady
 2010 - Miss Keepsake
 2009 - Purple
 2008 - Riva San
 2007 - Eskimo Queen
 2006 - Allow
 2005 - Vitesse Dane
 2004 - Vouvray
 2003 - Zagalia
 2002 - Mon Mekki
 2001 - Ethereal
 2000 - Giovana
 1999 - Miss Danehill
 1998 - Zacheline
 1997 - Crystal Palace
 1996 - Arctic Scent
 1995 - Joie Denise
 1994 - Booked
 1993 - Slight Chance
 1992 - Royal Magic
 1991 - Triscay
 1990 - A Little Kiss
 1989 - Triumphal Queen
 1988 - Bravery
 1987 - Round The World
 1986 - Travel Light
 1985 - Tristram Rose
 1984 - Look Aloft
 1983 - Lady Plutus
 1982 - Mother Of Pearl
 1981 - November Rain
 1980 - Lowan Star
 1979 - Prunella
 1978 - Show Ego
 1977 - Surround
 1976 - Denise's Joy
 1975 - Zasu
 1974 - Bonnybel
 1973 - Analie
 1972 - Meanmi Shadow
 1971 - Mode
 1970 - Affectionate
 1969 - Kazan Retto
 1968 - Bright Shadow
 1967 - Ryeleah
 1966 - Blue Roc
 1965 - Kulali
 1964 - Eye Shadow
 1963 - Aspalita
 1962 - Hoa Hine
 1961 - Winnipeg II
 1960 - Ton
 1959 - Golden Stockade
 1958 - Orient
 1957 - race not held
 1956 - Urgona
 1955 - Evening Peal
 1954 - Mian Mir
 1953 - Caeneus
 1952 - Lady Hannah
 1951 - Malt Maid

‡ Not held because of the COVID-19 pandemic

See also
 List of Australian Group races
 Group races

References

External links
 News Report -2008 Qld Oaks Winner

Sport in Brisbane
Group 1 stakes races in Australia
Flat horse races for three-year-old fillies